Dragan Crnogorac may refer to:

 Dragan Crnogorac (war criminal), Bosnian Serb war criminal
 Dragan Crnogorac (politician) (born 1978), Croatian Serb politician